Leptolaena is a genus of flowering plants in the family Sarcolaenaceae. There are 8 species, all native to Madagascar.

Species
Species include:

 Leptolaena abrahamii
 Leptolaena cuspidata
 Leptolaena delphinensis
 Leptolaena gautieri
 Leptolaena masoalensis
 Leptolaena multiflora
 Leptolaena pauciflora
 Leptolaena raymondii

References

 
Malvales genera
Taxonomy articles created by Polbot